Songwriter's networks in the United States of America are generally volunteer-run or non-profit organizations that support the networking of songwriters in the area. The organization may be an active group in the community, sponsoring seminars, meetings, showcase performance events, and other gatherings in which songwriters can socialize and build valuable business contacts.

Songwriter network organizations are opportunities for music industry representatives to meet with songwriters and discuss their experiences in the industry.

In a songwriting network, a group of songwriters can:
A) Learn the importance of networking with each other
B) Meet guest speakers from many different areas of the music industry or music business.
C) Encourage one another and share tips and advice
D) Collaborate with others in the network as composers, lyricists, producers, etc.

Further reading 
 Los Angeles Songwriters Network
 Los Angeles Free Music Society

References 
  Los Angeles Songwriters Network (SongNet)

External links 
 Christian Songwriter's Network
 
 [ Allmusic Page]
 Songwriters Resource Network
 The Nashville Songwriters Network

American songwriters
Music organizations based in the United States